Braeside School is an independent school located in Buckhurst Hill in Essex that is part of The Oak-Tree Group of Schools.

The school is an all-through day school for girls aged 2 1/2 to 16. Since 2020, both the Junior School and Senior School have been on the same site, on High Road, Buckhurst Hill, which formerly was exclusively for the Seniors.

History 
In September 2015 Braeside became part of the Oak-Tree Group of Schools.

Alumni
 Louise Jameson, actress.

References

External links
School website

Private schools in Essex